McEnery is a surname. Notable people with the surname include:

David McEnery (1914–2002), American musician
Jeff McEnery (born 1984), Canadian comedian
John McEnery (born 1943), English actor and writer
John McEnery (1833–1891), American politician
Kate McEnery (born 1981), English actor
Peter McEnery (born 1940), English actor
Ruth McEnery Stuart (1849–1917), American writer
Samuel D. McEnery (1837–1910), American politician
Tom McEnery (born 1945), American businessman and writer